Andrezinho may refer to:
Andrezinho (footballer, born 1975), Azerbaijan international footballer
Andrezinho (footballer, born 1981), Brazilian footballer
Andrezinho (footballer, born 1982), Brazilian footballer
Andrezinho (footballer, born 1983), Brazilian footballer
Andrezinho (footballer, born 1985), Brazilian footballer
Andrezinho (footballer, born 1986), Brazilian footballer
Andrezinho (footballer, born 1995), Portuguese footballer
Andrezinho, Brazilian musician formerly with the band Molejo